Carl Leigh Summerell (born December 6, 1951) is a former American football quarterback in the National Football League who played for the New York Giants. He played college football for the East Carolina Pirates.

He is in East Carolina's athletic Hall of Fame.

References

1951 births
Living people
American football quarterbacks
New York Giants players
East Carolina Pirates football players